Bhimeshwor Academy  is a secondary school situated at Gothatar-8, Kandaghari, Kathmandu, Nepal. It was established in 2006 (2062 B.S.). It is providing education to about 500 students from grades Nursery to 10. It is affiliated under School Leaving Certificate (SLC).

History
It was started with motto "Scientific and Qualitative Education is our motto" from class Nursery to 5. By 2014, it is running up to class 10.

See also
 List of schools in Nepal
 School Leaving Certificate (Nepal)

References

External links
 

Secondary schools in Nepal
Educational institutions established in 2006
2006 establishments in Nepal